The 1967–68 Segunda Divisão season was the 34th season of the competition and the 34th season of recognized second-tier football in Portugal.

League standings

Segunda Divisão - Zona Norte

Segunda Divisão - Zona Sul

Championship play-off

References

Portuguese Second Division seasons
Port
2